The Kathryn Wentzel Lumley Aviation Center  abbreviated as KWLAC and KWL Aviation Center is a branch of Pennsylvania College of Technology which focuses on aeronautical studies. It is located about 7 miles from main campus and on the grounds of Williamsport Regional Airport in Montoursville, Pennsylvania.

The building was announced in 1991 and was opened in 1993 and studies began immediately.

Promise
Kathryn Wentz Aviation Center provides full Federal Aviation Administration (FAA) and Transport certified repair and maintenance programs. The branch has received multiple recognition by local media and is a highly recommend aviation school in Pennsylvania.

History
Pennsylvania College of Technology announcement in 1991 that the need for an aviation branch. In early 1992 work on the building began and in 1993 it was opened as Private College Aviation Center'. The building hadn't been given its current name until 2007.

In 2010 FedEx Express donated a Boeing 727 to the university. The Aviation Center has four aircraft that it works on, the Boeing 727, two Cessna 172s.

See also
 Pennsylvania College of Technology
 Williamsport Regional Airport

References

External links
 

Aviation schools in the United States
Educational institutions established in 1993
Buildings and structures in Lycoming County, Pennsylvania
Pennsylvania State University
Education in Lycoming County, Pennsylvania
1993 establishments in Pennsylvania